Tammy Tyrrell (born on 1 August 1970) is an Australian senator and a member of the Jacqui Lambie Network. She ran in the 2022 Australian federal election to represent Tasmania in the Senate, and was elected to fill the sixth vacancy. Her 6-year term started on 1 July 2022.

Career
Tyrrell was raised in Ulverstone, Tasmania, and did not go to university. She worked for 15 years in employment services. From 2014 to 2022, she worked as a staff member for Senator Jacqui Lambie. She was selected as the lead candidate on the Jacqui Lambie Network's Senate ticket for the 2022 federal election, and successfully won election, defeating incumbent senator Eric Abetz.

References 

Living people
Members of the Australian Senate
Members of the Australian Senate for Tasmania
Women members of the Australian Senate
21st-century Australian politicians
21st-century Australian women politicians
Year of birth missing (living people)
People from Ulverstone, Tasmania